The Ahmadilis, also known as the Atabegs of Maragheh (Atābakān-e Marāghe) were a local Turcoman dynasty who ruled from the early 12th century until 1208–09 in Maragheh itself and in Rūʾīn Dez for some years after the Mongol conquest. They ruled approximately from 1122 to 1225.

Notices in the chronicles of this localised line of Atabegs are only sporadic, and numismatic evidences have not thus far been found, so it is difficult to reconstruct their chronology and genealogy. Bosworth says that they were a dynasty of Turkic origin that started with Aq Sunqur Ahmadili who was presumably a freedman of the Kurdish commander of the Seljuq Empire, Ahmadil ibn Ibrahim. A female member of the family, Sulafa Khatun, was ruling Maragheh until these places were sacked by the Mongols in 1221.In 1225, Sulafa Khatun married the Khwarazmian ruler Jalal ad-Din Mingburnu, who administered her territories. In 1231, the region fell to the Mongol armies.

Rulers
 Aq Sunqur I, 1122-1134
 Ak Sunkur II, 1134-1169
 Ala al-Din Korpe Arslan and Rukn al-Din, 1134-1173
 Falak al-Din, 1173-1189
 Ala-al-Din Korpe Arslan, 1189-1208
 Arslan-Aba II, 1208-1209
 Sulafa Khatun, 1209-1225

See also 
Turkic peoples#History
Timeline of the Turkic peoples (500–1300)
List of Turkic dynasties and countries

References

Bibliography

Further reading
 
 

Turkic dynasties
History of East Azerbaijan Province
Maragheh County
Atabegs